Compsoctena leucoconis is a moth in the family Eriocottidae. It was described by Edward Meyrick in 1926. It is found in Namibia.

References

Endemic fauna of Namibia
Moths described in 1926
Compsoctena
Lepidoptera of Namibia